Maria Alfero (1 March 1922 - 4 September 2001) was an Italian sprinter.

Biography
She won bronze medal in the 4×100 metres relay, first medal of ever for the Italian women in a relay race, at the 1938 European Athletics Championships in Vienna, with Maria Apollonio, Rosetta Cattaneo and Italia Lucchini She has 6 caps in national team from 1938 to 1940.

Achievements

National titles
Maria Alfero has won one time the individual national championship.
1 win in the 100 metres (1938)

See also
 Italy national relay team

References

External links
 Maria Alfero at TheSports.org

1922 births
2001 deaths
Italian female sprinters
European Athletics Championships medalists
20th-century Italian women
21st-century Italian women